This is a list of Portuguese language authors, by country and then alphabetically. 


Angola
Agostinho Neto
Ana Paula Tavares
José Eduardo Agualusa
José de Fontes Pereira
Kardo Bestilo
Ondjaki
Pepetela
Sousa Jamba
Uanhenga Xitu ou Mendes de Carvalho
Viriato da Cruz

Brazil

A
Adélia Prado
Adolfo Caminha
Adriana Falcão
Adriana Lisboa
Afonso Arinos
Affonso Romano de Sant'Anna
Alberto de Oliveira
Alcântara Machado
Alphonsus de Guimarães
Aluísio Azevedo
Alvarenga Peixoto
Álvares de Azevedo
Ana Cristina César
Ana Maria Machado
Ângela Lago
Aníbal Machado
Antônio Callado
Antônio de Castro Alves
Araripe Júnior
Artur Azevedo
Arnaldo Antunes
Augusto de Campos
Augusto dos Anjos
Autran Dourado
Ariano Suassuna

B
Ștefan Baciu
Basílio da Gama
Beatriz Francisca de Assis Brandão
Bento Teixeira
Bruna Lombardi

C
Caio Fernando Abreu
Capistrano de Abreu
Carlos Drummond de Andrade
Carlos Heitor Cony
Casimiro de Abreu
Cassiano Ricardo
Cecília Meireles
Chico Buarque
Chico César
Clarice Lispector
Cristovão Tezza
Cruz e Sousa

D
Dalton Trevisan
Dias Gomes
Darcy Ribeiro
Décio Pignatari
Drauzio Varella

E
Elisa Lucinda
Érico Veríssimo
Euclides da Cunha

F
Fagundes Varela
Fernando Sabino
Fernando Gabeira
Ferreira Gullar
Ferréz
Flávio Carneiro

G
Gilberto Freyre
Gilka Machado
Gonçalves de Magalhães
Gonçalves Dias
Graciliano Ramos
Graça Aranha
Gregório de Matos Guerra
Gustavo Barroso

H
Hilda Hilst
Huberto Rohden

I
Ignácio de Loyola Brandão

J
João do Rio
João Cabral de Melo Neto
João Gilberto Noll
João Guimarães Rosa
João Simões Lopes Neto
João Ubaldo Ribeiro
Joaquim de Sousa Andrade
Jorge Amado
José de Alencar
José J. Veiga
José Lins do Rego
Julio Cézar Ribeiro Vaughan
Jô Soares

L
Leo Vaz
Lima Barreto
Lúcia Benedetti
Luis Fernando Verissimo
Luiz Ruffato
Lygia Fagundes Telles

M
Maciel Monteiro
Machado de Assis
Manuel Bandeira
Márcio Souza
Maria José Dupré
Mário de Andrade
Mário Quintana
Menotti del Picchia
Miguel M. Abrahão
Millôr Fernandes
Mino Carta
Moacyr Scliar
Murilo Mendes
Murilo Rubião

N
Nelson Rodrigues
Nina Rodrigues

O
Otto Lara Resende
Otto Maria Carpeaux
Oswald de Andrade

P
Paulo Aquarone
Paulo Coelho
Paulo Freire
Paulo Leminski
Paulo Lins
Paulo Mendes Campos
Pedro Nava

Q
Qorpo Santo

R
Rachel de Queiroz
Raduan Nassar
Raphael Montes
Raul Bopp
Raul Pompéia
Regina Rheda
Roberto Drummond
Rodolfo Teófilo
Ryoki Inoue
Rubem Alves
Rubem Braga
Rubem Fonseca
Rui Barbosa
Ruth Rocha

S
Santiago Nazarian
Sérgio Buarque de Hollanda
Sérgio Sant'Anna
Sousândrade

T
Tânia Martins

V
Vinicius de Moraes

Z
Zélia Gattai

Cape Verde
Amílcar Cabral
Germano Almeida
Jorge Barbosa
Onésimo Silveira
Orlanda Amarílis
Viriato de Barros

Galicia

Ricardo Carvalho Calero
Rosalia de Castro
Curros Henriques
Ricardo Flores Peres
Eduardo Pondal

Guinea-Bissau
Abdulai Silá
Amílcar Cabral
Vasco Cabral

Mozambique
Carlos Cardoso
Eduardo White
João Paulo Borges Coelho
José Craveirinha
Lília Momplé
Lina Magaia
Luís Bernardo Honwana
Luís Carlos Patraquim
Marcelino dos Santos
Mia Couto
Noémia de Sousa
Orlando Mendes (1916–1990), novelist.
Paulina Chiziane
Rui Knopfli
Ungulani Ba Ka Khosa

Portugal

A
Abel Botelho
Al Berto
Alexandre Herculano
Alexandre Maria Pinheiro Torres
Almada Negreiros
Almeida Garrett
Alves Redol
Antero de Quental
António Botto
António Feliciano de Castilho
António Gomes Leal
António Gonçalves de Bandarra
António Lobo Antunes
António Nobre
António Vicente Campinas
António Vieira

B
Fernanda Botelho

C
Camilo Castelo Branco
Christovão Falcão

E
Eça de Queiroz (José Maria)

F
Fernando Monteiro de Castro Soromenho
Fernando Pessoa
Fernão Lopes
Ferreira de Castro
Francisco Adolfo Coelho
Francisco Gomes de Amorim

G
Garcia de Resende
Gil Vicente

J
João de Barros
João-Maria Nabais
José Rodrigues Miguéis
José Saramago

L
Luiz Francisco Rebello
Luís Vaz de Camões
Luiz Pacheco

M
Manuel Alegre
Manuel António Pina
Manuel da Fonseca
Manuel Maria Barbosa du Bocage
Manuel Teixeira Gomes
Maria Amália Vaz de Carvalho
Maria Judite de Carvalho
Maria Velho da Costa
Mário de Sá-Carneiro
Matilde Rosa Araújo (1921-2010) 
Miguel Sousa Tavares

N
Natália Correia

R
Ramalho Ortigão 
Raul Brandão

S
Soeiro Pereira Gomes
Ana Eduarda Santos

T
Teixeira de Pascoaes

U
Urbano Tavares Rodrigues

V
Vergílio Ferreira

São Tomé and Príncipe
Conceição Lima

East Timor
Luís Cardoso

References

Portuguese language
Portuguese language